Laura Moreno Márquez (born 18 September 1993) is a Cuban footballer who plays as a midfielder. She has been a member of the Cuba women's national team.

International career
Moreno capped for Cuba at senior level during the 2018 CONCACAF Women's Championship (and its qualification).

References

1993 births
Living people
Cuban women's footballers
Cuba women's international footballers
Women's association football midfielders
21st-century Cuban women